"Without Her" is a song written and recorded by American singer-songwriter Harry Nilsson, released on his 1967 album Pandemonium Shadow Show.

Background
The song, a Baroque pop single, is played with cello and a countermelody performed on a flute, based on about a half dozen chords. One of Nilsson's first hits (although a minor one), it explains the sadness of dreaming each night that the woman he loves will be there
but, she never is, and the melancholy of spending another day without her.

Other recorded versions
Jack Jones recorded a version which served as the title track of a 1967 album. 
Also in 1967, the song was covered by singer Glen Campbell on his,Gentle on My Mind album.
In 1968, the American band Blood, Sweat & Tears covered it on their debut album, Child Is Father to the Man. 
A version by Herb Alpert appeared on the Warm album by Herb Alpert and the Tijuana Brass. 
Brazilian Bossa nova singer Astrud Gilberto recorded it in 1969, for her, I Haven't Got Anything Better to Do album.
Scottish singer Lulu covered the song as "Without Him". Lulu's version was the B-side of her 1968 single 'I'm A Tiger'. 
Julie London also recorded the song as "Without Him" on the last album she ever released: "Yummy, Yummy, Yummy" in 1969.
Without Her' was also the only single released in 1968 by Anthony Browne.
 In Spanish the song was recorded by the Mexican singer José José, "Sin Ella" (Without Her), and is included in his first 1969 album "CUIDADO" in a Bossa Nova version.

References

External links 
http://www.allmusic.com/song/without-her-mt0011361024
http://www.discogs.com/artist/152685-Harry-Nilsson
http://www.discogs.com/Harry-Nilsson-Pandemonium-Shadow-Show/master/96883

1967 songs
Harry Nilsson songs
Songs written by Harry Nilsson